The Vornedskab was a serfdom-like institution introduced in Denmark in the late 14th-century to ensure a working force for the landowners in a time period when the population of Denmark had diminished after the Black Death in Denmark, and the landowners wanted to prevent the remaining peasantry from achieving better conditions or leaving the countryside for the cities. It was abolished in 1702. In 1733, serfdom was reintroduced in Denmark under the new name Stavnsbånd.

References

Serfdom
Social history of Denmark
Labor in Denmark
14th century in Denmark
1702 in Denmark